Jeon Moo-song (born September 28, 1941) is a South Korean actor. Jeon began his career on stage in the play 'Chunhyangjeon' in 1964  and has since been active in Korean theatre, film and television. In 1977, he performed as the title character in Crown Prince Hamyeol (an adaptation of Hamlet) at La MaMa in New York City, which marked the first time a Korean theatre troupe had traveled outside Korea. Jeon also won two trophies from the Grand Bell Awards for his portrayal of an eccentric monk in Im Kwon-taek's 1981 film Mandala.

Jeon is also the subject of an internet meme titled "High Expectations Asian Father" wherein his image, taken from his cameo in the film Epitaph, is paired with an exaggerated quote usually associated with the stereotypical image of an Asian parent trying to set a high standard for their children.

Filmography

Film

Television series

Variety show

Theater

Awards and nominations

References

External links
 
 
 

1941 births
Living people
20th-century South Korean male actors
21st-century South Korean male actors
South Korean male stage actors
South Korean male film actors
South Korean male television actors
Seoul Institute of the Arts alumni
People from Haeju
Best Actor Paeksang Arts Award (theatre) winners